Grill'd is an Australian-owned multinational casual dining restaurant chain specialising in healthy burgers. Founded by Simon Crowe in 2004 in Hawthorn, Melbourne, the group now has over 150 restaurants.

History

The chain was originally founded after Crowe was frustrated by a lack of "decent burgers" in Australia and wanted an enticing, nutritious meal combined with the engaging service ethic he often encountered living in Milwaukee, United States while working for Fosters brewing company.

By 2006, two years after its founding, Grill'd had over 30 restaurants across Melbourne. In 2011, Grill’d launched its Local Matters program where each customer is provided a token per burger to vote for 1 of 3 restaurant-specific local community groups. At the end of each month, $500 per restaurant is donated among the three community groups, totalling over $750,000 each year in donations. As of September 2021, Grill’d have given over $6 million to over 30,000 local community groups, organisations, and projects.

Since 2010, all of the company's beef and lamb is grass-fed and free-range, and in 2016 all of their chicken became RSPCA Approved. In 2019 Grill'd launched Beyond Meat's plant-based meat-tasting pattie with a "Meat Free Day". In November 2021, Grill'd launched the Impossible Foods plant-based meat-tasting burgers.

Grill’d launched an Emu & Kangaroo burger The Coat of Arms in 2013, a rabbit burger Bunny Burger in 2017, and their Healthy Fried Chicken in 2020.

In 2019, Grill'd opened their first international restaurant, in Seminyak, Bali, Indonesia. The restaurant extended the company's Local Matters program internationally, supporting Seminyak's local community groups by sharing Rp2,500,000 with three local groups each month.

Community & Charity 
The Grill'd Local Matters program started in 2011 as a way for each restaurant to support its own, local community groups. As of September 2021, the program had given back over $6,000,000 to local community groups, including over $120,000 to help tackle homelessness, and over $800,000 to health and disability groups. The program has supported over 30,000 community groups, organisations, and projects made up of local sports groups, youth organisations, educational services, animal welfare and environmental groups.

Grill'd was an early participant in Movember from 2006 to 2011, offering a free burger for anyone who grew a ‘Mo', and later became a major sponsor of Polished Man, gifting burgers to guests who donated to the cause.

Additionally, the Grill'd Relish membership program gives members a free burger after eight visits which they can take themselves, or give to those in need through the work of the Society of St. Vincent de Paul, also known as Vinnies.

In 2019, with bushfires raging across Australia, Grill'd started a charity initiative on Instagram,  donating 10c for every Like the post received to the Vinnies Bushfire relief.

Grill'd then extended their efforts, matching every ace Nick Kyrgios served at the Australian Open with $200 donated to the Vinnies Bushfire Relief. The company extended its efforts again in Feb 2020, donating $2 for every burger a Relish Member bought, and another $2 for every new member signed up, raising a total donation of $236,302 for Vinnies Bushfire Relief.

Product

Quality produce 
Grill'd claims to have an Australian-first sourcing promise and works with the local farmers and suppliers to keep food miles low and ensure the freshest ingredients. Since 2010, all of the company's beef and lamb is grass-fed and free-range, and in 2016 all of their chicken became the RSPCA Approved and have used free-range eggs since their inception. The Grill’d food journey is described as being from ‘farm to fingers’ offering a range of higher welfare meat options along with vegetarian and vegan options, as well as catering menu options to other dietary preferences of flexitarianism, paleo, gluten-free and low-carb. In 2017, Grill’d partnered with the RSPCA to raise awareness about the suffering of hens confined to battery cages as part of the RSPCA's End the Battery Cage campaign.

Healthy Fried Chicken 
In 2020, Grill'd launched "Healthy Fried Chicken" with HFC Bites in a campaign that ‘flipped the bird  to fast food giant KFC by offering all KFC employees free HFC Bites when they visit a Grill'd store in their uniform. Following the release of HFC Bites, in 2021 Grill'd expanded its fried chicken line with HFC Burgers and publicly released its "No Secrets" recipe for consumers to see what goes into, and how to make their Healthy Fried Chicken. The Grill'd HFC Burgers are significantly lower in kilojoules per 100g than other fried chicken burgers, are high in protein and fibre, low in saturated and trans fats, an excellent source of Vitamin E, and provide at least seven essential vitamins and minerals.

HFC is all natural with no artificial colours, flavours and preservatives; are gluten-free, cooked in Australian extra virgin olive oil, made with higher welfare RSPCA approved chicken breast, and free from added hormones or chemicals.

 Plant-based vegan range 
In 2019, Monday April 15, Grill'd hosted the "24 Hour Meat Cheat", serving only meat-free options to launch the Beyond Meat Burgers onto their menu.

In July 2021, Grill'd, in collaboration with the company Fable and British chef Heston Blumenthal, created three new plant-based burgers with patties from mushroom-based protein.

In November 2021, Grill'd was the first national restaurant chain to launch Impossible Foods Impossible Beef in Australia. To support the launch, Australian comedy duo The Inspired Unemployed revealed the new ‘meat' with an OnlyFans account.

 Marketing and innovation 
In 2013, the Coat of Arms Burger was launched ahead of Australia Day, with all-Australian ingredients, including a meat pattie made from the two animals represented on the Commonwealth Coat of Arms, the kangaroo and emu.

In 2017 Grill'd launched the ‘Bunny Burger' with a rabbit pattie to celebrate Easter. In 2018, Grill'd  revealed a new Bunny Burger made with 100% vegan ingredients.

In 2018, Three Blue Ducks' Darren Robertson created a Splendour in the Grass Burger to celebrate Byron Bay produce. The burger featured slow-cooked belly pork from Bangalow Sweet Pork  (a producer just outside of Byron), fennel and cabbage slaw with finger lime mayo, and smoked sea salt from South Australia's Eyre Peninsula. The burger was on sale in selected Grill'd restaurants around Australia until July 23, 2018, and the Grill'd Burger Park during Splendour in the Grass on July 21–23.
In 2020, to celebrate their activations at the Australian Open, Grill'd launched the Grand Slam Burger, featuring smashed avo, charred pineapple, crispy bacon, RSPCA Approved chicken breast and sweet chilli mayo. The burger was available at select Grill'd restaurants in Melbourne, and at the Grand Slam Oval and Ballpark pop-ups at the Australian Open.

In August 2020, Grill’d announced their menu of burgers, sides and sauces were all natural with no artificial colours, flavours and preservatives (with the exception of Beyond Burgers, Bacon and Vegan cheese), marked by the launch of their "100% Natural" campaign. The company worked with independent nutritionist body, Food and Nutrition Australia, to review the entire burger menu, reformulating the ingredients to remove any artificial additives and to further reduce kilojoules and sugars, resulting in 73% of their burgers providing less than a third of the daily energy intake for adults.

In 2021, Grill'd partnered with streaming service, Binge, to launch season 10 of The Walking Dead with a limited edition burger creation available in each state of Australia containing a panko crumbed and deep-fried lamb brain, in-between a charcoal bun, topped with oak leaf lettuce, tomato, rhubarb, beetroot ketchup, and dripping in a specially-made ‘brainnaise’ sauce. The burgers sold out within hours across the country and the campaign was shortlisted in the Mumbrella CommsCon Awards for Best Use of Owned Media.Partnerships & sponsorships'''

Grill'd have been a Premium Partner of the Melbourne Storm NRL Club, since 2020, and in the first year of partnership, Grill'd supported Storm on their journey to win their fourth Premiership. To celebrate the partnership, Grill'd created a Storm Burger exclusively for members and fans. Six of the Storm players had a hand in developing the perfect combination for the Storm Burger: Brandon Smith, Christian Welch, Cooper Johns, Harry Grant, Josh Addo-Carr and Ryan Papenhuyzen. Each player nominated their favourite ingredients, bringing their wish list together to design Australia's first burger created by an NRL team.

Grill'd have been the healthy eating partner of the Melbourne Boomers since the 2020 season. Boomers General Manager, Christy Collier-Hill said "we're so excited to welcome Grill'd as a team sponsor for WNBL Season 2020 and we are looking forward to a very healthy, long-term partnership.

 Sustainability 
Grill'd were the first restaurant group in Australia to go plastic-straw free in 2018, saving 1.7 million plastic straws from landfill each year. All of the takeaway packaging paper and cardboard, knife sleeves and kids pack packaging is PEFC and FSC Certified which comes from sustainably planted forests; for every tree cut down, another one gets planted in its place.

In 2021, Grill'd partnered with not-for-profit environmental organisation Greenfleet as part of the company's Tree Day Tuesday initiative, aiming to plant 10 forests by 2022 that will be protected for 100 years. Every Tuesday, $1 from every burger purchased by a Grill'd Relish member goes towards planting trees, working with the Dja Dja Wurrung people to offset carbon emissions. Working with the Dja Dja Wurrung people, Greenfleet planted native trees that revegetate their area and help restore the natural ecosystem.

Grill'd was named one of Australia's top 10 brands in the 2021 Forces of Good Report, and the number 1 brand in the food category for Corporate Social Responsibility which analysed 190 brands. "We’re always thinking bigger and doing better to further reduce our footprint," Grill'd said in a statement, "sustainability is a driving factor in our decision making, with everything from the local sourcing of our ingredients to the recycled furnishings in our restaurants".

Grill'd has also recycled over 660,000 litres of cooking oil to create biodiesel, and has converted 62 of its restaurants to green power.

 Controversies 
In June 2015, it came to public attention that the Toowong franchise had selected pro-life group Cherish Life to receive funds from the Local Matters program. Founder Simon Crowe apologised for the alleged mistake, stating that Grill'd is pro-choice.

The restaurant chain encountered controversy in July 2015 when allegations arose that Kahlani Pyrah, a former employee of the Camberwell franchise, had been removed from her position after beginning a wage case with the Fair Work Commission to overturn a contract which set pay below the minimum award rate. Grill'd officially denied the allegations, claiming that her bullying of managers was the reason for the dismissal. Pyrah launched a Federal Court case in a bid to get her job back. An interim Federal Court ruling ordered Grill'd to reinstate her, allowing the wage case hearing to go ahead. At the hearing, a ruling by the Fair Work Commission forced Grill'd to raise the wages of employees at its Camberwell franchise to be in line the award rate. Jess Walsh of the hospitality union United Voice said that the ruling was an "enormous win" for Pyrah and Grill'd employees. A planned dismissal hearing at the Federal Court was called off after Pyrah and Grill'd reached an out-of-court settlement.

In 2019 serious allegations were made against Grill'd by The Sydney Morning Herald and The Age'' concerning misuse of government subsidies to reduce staffing expenses. The coverage also include allegations of "serious" food safety concerns at 1-in-10 company-owned Grill'd restaurants. Allegations also included franchises being mistreated by the company and founder Simon Crowe falsifying signatures of his business partner on two liquor licenses.

See also 
 List of restaurants in Australia
 List of hamburger restaurants

References

Further reading 
 
 
 
 

Fast-food chains of Australia
Fast-food hamburger restaurants
Restaurants established in 2004
2004 establishments in Australia
Companies based in Melbourne